Irenepharsus is a genus of flowering plants belonging to the family Brassicaceae.

Its native range is south-eastern Australia.

The genus name of Irenepharsus refers to the Greek mythological goddess of Eirene.

The genus was circumscribed by Helen Joan Hewson in  Fl. Australia Vol.8 on page 349 in 1982.

Known species
As accepted by Plants of the Wrld Online;
Irenepharsus magicus 
Irenepharsus phasmatodes 
Irenepharsus trypherus

References

Brassicaceae
Brassicaceae genera
Plants described in 1982
Flora of Australia